Igor Zubrilin (born March 20, 1976 in Astana) is a Kazakhstani cross-country skier. He competed at the Winter Olympics in 2002 in Salt Lake City, in the 15 km and in the 50 km.

References

External links 
 

1976 births
Living people
Kazakhstani male cross-country skiers
Olympic cross-country skiers of Kazakhstan
Cross-country skiers at the 2002 Winter Olympics
Asian Games medalists in cross-country skiing
Cross-country skiers at the 1999 Asian Winter Games
Cross-country skiers at the 2003 Asian Winter Games
Sportspeople from Astana
Medalists at the 1999 Asian Winter Games
Asian Games gold medalists for Kazakhstan
20th-century Kazakhstani people
21st-century Kazakhstani people